The political philosopher Sheldon Wolin coined the term inverted totalitarianism  in 2003 to describe what he saw as the emerging form of government of the  United States. Wolin analysed the United States as increasingly turning into a managed democracy (similar to an illiberal democracy). He uses the term "inverted totalitarianism" to draw attention to the totalitarian aspects of the American political system and argues that the American government has similarities to the Nazi government.  

The book Days of Destruction, Days of Revolt (2012) by Chris Hedges and Joe Sacco portrays inverted totalitarianism as a system where corporations have corrupted and subverted democracy and where economics bests politics. Every natural resource and living being is commodified and exploited by large corporations to the point of collapse as excess consumerism and sensationalism lull and manipulate the citizenry into surrendering their liberties and their participation in government.

Inverted totalitarianism and managed democracy 
Wolin argues that the United States is increasingly totalitarian as a result of repeated military mobilizations: to fight the Axis powers in the 1940s, to contain communism during the Cold War, and to fight the War on Terror after the September 11 attacks.

Wolin describes this development toward inverted totalitarianism in terms of two conflicting political power centers, namely the constitutional imaginary and the power imaginary. Wolin speaks of imaginaries to include political tendencies as well as existing political conditions. He explains: 

Wolin explains that the constitutional imaginary "prescribes the means by which power is legitimated, accountable and constrained". Referring to Thomas Hobbes, Wolin understands the power imaginary as a quest for power that is rationalized by fear of collective mortality. The power imaginary may "undermine or override the boundaries mandated in the constitutional imaginary" through fears of a dangerous enemy: 

The power imaginary does not only reduce democracy within the United States, it also promotes the United States as a "Superpower" that develops and expands its current position as the only global superpower:

Comparison to classical totalitarian regimes 
Inverted totalitarianism shares similarities with classical totalitarianism, like Nazi Germany. First of all, both regimes are totalitarian because they tend to dominate as much as possible. Both regimes use fear, preemptive wars and elite domination, but inverted and classical totalitarianism deviate in several important ways:
 Revolution – While the classical totalitarian regimes overthrew the established system, inverted totalitarianism instead exploits the legal and political constraints of the established democratic system and uses these constraints to defeat their original purpose.
 Government – Whereas the classical totalitarian government was an ordered, idealized and coordinated whole, inverted totalitarianism is a managed democracy which applies managerial skills to basic democratic political institutions. 
 Propaganda and dissent – Although propaganda plays an essential role in both the United States and Nazi Germany, the role it plays in the United States is inverted; that is, American propaganda "is only in part a state-centered phenomenon". Whereas the production of propaganda was crudely centralized in Nazi Germany, in the United States it is left to highly concentrated media corporations and thus maintaining the illusion of a "free press". According to this model, dissent is allowed, though the corporate media serve as a filter, allowing most people, with limited time available to keep themselves apprised of current events, to hear only points of view that the corporate media deem "serious".
 Democracy – Whereas the classical totalitarian regimes overthrew weak democracies/regimes, inverted totalitarianism has developed from a strong democracy. The United States even maintains its democracy is the model for the whole world.
Wolin writes: 
 Ideology – Inverted totalitarianism deviates from the Nazi regime as to ideology, i.e. cost-effectiveness versus master race. 
 Economy – In Nazi Germany, the state dominated the economic actors whereas in inverted totalitarianism corporations through lobbying, political contributions and the revolving door dominate the United States, with the government acting as the servant of large corporations. This is considered "normal" rather than corrupt. 
 Nationalism – While Nazi Germany and Fascist Italy were nationalistic, inverted totalitarianism is a global superpower based on global exchange of jobs, culture and commodities.
 The people – While the classical totalitarian regimes aimed at the constant political mobilization of the populace, inverted totalitarianism aims for the mass of the populace to be in a persistent state of political apathy. The only type of political activity expected or desired from the citizenry is voting. Low electoral turnouts are favorably received as an indication that the bulk of the populace has given up hope that the government will ever significantly help them.
 Punishment – While the classical totalitarian regimes punished harshly (imprisoning or killing political or ideological opponents and scapegoats), inverted totalitarianism in particular punishes by means of an economy of fear (minimizing social security,  busting unions, outdating skills, outsourcing jobs and so on).
 Leader – While the classical totalitarian regimes had charismatic leaders that were the architects of the state, inverted totalitarianism does not depend on a certain leader, but produces its leaders who are akin to corporate leaders.
 Social policy – While Nazism made life uncertain for the wealthy and privileged and had a social policy for the working class, inverted totalitarianism exploits the poor by reducing health and social programs and weakening working conditions.

Managed democracy 
The superpower claims both democracy and global hegemony. Democracy and hegemony are coupled by means of managed democracy, where the elections are free and fair but the people lack the actual ability to change the policies, motives and goals of the state.

Managerial methods are applied to elections: 

By using managerial methods and developing management of elections, the democracy of the United States has become sanitized of political participation, therefore managed democracy is "a political form in which governments are legitimated by elections that they have learned to control". Under managed democracy, the electorate is prevented from having a significant impact on policies adopted by the state because of the opinion construction and manipulation carried out by means of technology, social science, contracts and corporate subsidies.

Managerial methods are also the means by which state and global corporations unite so that corporations increasingly assume governmental functions and services and corporations become still more dependent on the state. A main object of managed democracy is privatization and the expansion of the private, together with reduction of governmental responsibility for the welfare of the citizens.

According to Wolin, the United States has two main totalizing dynamics:
 The first, directed outward, finds its expression in the global War on Terror and in the Bush Doctrine that the United States has the right to launch preemptive wars. This amounts to the United States seeing as illegitimate the attempt by any state to resist its domination.
 The second dynamic, directed inward, involves the subjection of the mass of the populace to economic "rationalization", with continual "downsizing" and "outsourcing" of jobs abroad and dismantling of what remains of the welfare state created by President Franklin D. Roosevelt's New Deal and President Lyndon B. Johnson's Great Society. Neoliberalism is an integral component of inverted totalitarianism. The state of insecurity in which this places the public serves the useful function of making people feel helpless, therefore making it less likely they will become politically active and thus helping maintain the first dynamic.

Reception 
Sheldon Wolin's book Democracy Incorporated: Managed Democracy and the Specter of Inverted Totalitarianism received a Lannan Literary Award for an Especially Notable Book in 2008.

In a review of Wolin's Democracy Incorporated in Truthdig, political scientist and author Chalmers Johnson wrote that the book is a "devastating critique" of the contemporary government of the United States—including the way it has changed in recent years and the actions that "must" be undertaken "if it is not to disappear into history along with its classic totalitarian predecessors: Fascist Italy, Nazi Germany and Bolshevik Russia". In Johnson's view, Wolin’s is one of the best analyses of why presidential elections are unlikely to be effective in mitigating the detrimental effects of inverted totalitarianism. Johnson writes that Wolin’s work is "fully accessible" and that understanding Wolin's argument "does not depend on possessing any specialized knowledge". Johnson believes Wolin's analysis is more of an explanation of the problems of the United States than a description of how to solve these problems, "particularly since Wolin believes that the U.S. political system is corrupt" and "heavily influenced by financial contributions primarily from wealthy and corporate donors, but that nonetheless Wolin’s analysis is still one of the best discourses on where the U.S. went wrong".

Kevin Zeese and Margaret Flowers expressed the following view: We are living in a time of Inverted Totalitarianism, in which the tools used to maintain the status quo are much more subtle and technologically advanced ... These include propaganda and major media outlets that hide the real news about conditions at home and our activities around the world behind distractions [...] Another tool is to create insecurity in the population so that people are unwilling to speak out and take risks for fear of losing their jobs [...] Changes in college education also silence dissent [...] Adjunct professors [...] are less willing to teach topics that are viewed as controversial. This, combined with massive student debt, are tools to silence the student population, once the center of transformative action.

Chris Hedges has argued that the liberal class is unable to reform itself and that classical liberalism has been reduced to a political charade that is stage-managed within corporate capitalism. According to Hedges, political philosophers like Wolin are excluded from publications like The New York Times and New York Review of Books because academic intellectuals and journalists prize access to power rather than truth.

See also

Notes

References and further reading

External links 

 . Wolin and Chris Hedges discuss inverted totalitarianism. 
 .

20th century
21st century
Authoritarianism
Types of democracy
Political philosophy
Political science terminology
Political systems
Political theories
Totalitarianism
2003 neologisms
2004 neologisms